Butterfly Kisses is the second album released by American country music artist Jeff Carson. Released in 1997 on Curb Records, it features the singles "Butterfly Kisses" (a cover of Bob Carlisle's hit song from that same year) and "Here's the Deal". "Today I Started Loving You Again" is a cover of a Merle Haggard hit single, and features Haggard as a duet partner.

Track listing
"Butterfly Kisses" (Bob Carlisle, Randy Thomas) - 3:55
"Here's the Deal" (Jody Harris, Bobby Taylor) - 3:52
"She's the One" (Max T. Barnes) - 3:09
"Do It Again" (Jess Brown) - 3:39
"Try Bein' Me" (Tim Mensy) - 3:57
"If You Wanna Get to Heaven" (Steve Cash, John Dillon) - 3:11
"The Stone" (Danny Mayo, Bob Regan) - 3:34
"Hangin' by a Thread" (Steve Bogard, Amanda Hunt-Taylor, Jeff Stevens) - 3:13
"As One as Two Can Get" (Steve Siler, Jim Weatherly) - 3:20
"Cheatin' on Her Heart" (Porter Howell, Mark D. Sanders) - 3:20
"Today I Started Loving You Again" (Merle Haggard, Bonnie Owens) - 3:44
feat. Merle Haggard
"Butterfly Kisses/Daddy's Little Girl" - 4:06A
feat. Kippi Brannon
A"Butterfly Kisses" composed by Bob Carlisle and Randy Thomas; "Daddy's Little Girl" composed by Angela Kaset, Kenya Walker, and Stan Webb.

Personnel
Eddie Bayers - drums
Mike Brignardello - bass guitar
Jeff Carson - lead vocals, harmonica
J. T. Corenflos - electric guitar
Larry Franklin - fiddle
Paul Franklin - pedal steel guitar
David Hungate - bass guitar
Kerry Marx - electric guitar
Terry McMillan - harmonica, percussion
Greg Morrow - drums
Steve Nathan - keyboards
Brent Rowan - electric guitar
Michael Spriggs - acoustic guitar
Reggie Young - acoustic guitar

Chart performance

External links
[ Butterfly Kisses] at Allmusic

1997 albums
Jeff Carson albums
Curb Records albums